Van Diemen's Land is a studio album by Australian singer–songwriter Russell Morris. It was released on 11 April 2014 by Fanfare, Ambition Records.  The album peaked at number 4 on the ARIA Charts, becoming Morris' highest chart album in his career.

Van Diemen's Land covers great Australian characters and stories including Breaker Morant, Sandakan and Eureka Rebellion and features a host of special guest artists including Joe Camilleri, Rick Springfield, Rob Hirst (Midnight Oil), Scott Owen (The Living End), Ross Hannaford (Daddy Cool), Vika and Linda Bull, Phil Manning (Chain) and Joe Robinson.

Morris said; “Van Diemen’s Land is an album that has been an amazing experience to make. With the success of Sharkmouth, it really let me off my leash so to speak. It showed me that people want music that tells them a story and moves them.” 

A music video for the song "Van Diemen's Land" was released on 11 August 2014. It was directed by Lucas Thyer and filmed in Blue Lake in the Central Highlands of Tasmania.

Reception

Angus Fitz-Burden from Renowned for Sound said; "Other than the minimalist mid-album blues dirges "Breaker Morant" and "Loch and Gorge" and the telephone-filtered "Sandakan", the vast majority of the album doesn’t really stray from the stock standard, no frills Aussie pub-band sound of the early ‘80s that you still seem to hear in seedy pubs throughout the land however virtually doesn’t exist anymore on the vast spectrum of modern music. While it’s definitely nice to hear some attention paid to intriguing, textured lyrical content nowadays, they kind of read like that dusty old book of bush poetry that sits unread to this day on the bookshelf in your dad’s home-office."

Liz Giuffre from The Music AU said; "Clearly yearning for an old Australia, or at least wanting to have fun with some old myths and styles of old music, Russell Morris has delivered a mellow collection with Van Diemen's Land. Morris mixes international influences with local references from over time for his latest release. [It's] a good collection of folk/blues and national myths delivered by a man who knows his way around the local biz."

Courtney Laura of Reverb Online said; "It is evident through the detailed lyrics that he has spent quality time researching wonderful Australian stories and national myths, and constructing them into a collection of stunning folk and blues tracks. Throughout the whole album, Morris’s voice doesn’t waver as he adapts his vocals to each individual song and admirably clearly enunciates the stories through the lyrics. As each track is an unfolding story, they too have their own identity within the musicianship accompanying Morris." adding "Showcasing the spirit and history of our country, this is yet another of Morris’s projects to go out and add to your collection."

Michael Dwyer of Rolling Stone Australia said; "Like its predecessor, Van Diemen’s Land is all-true Aussie histories strung up on wiry blues arrangements like so many pages cut from yellowing broadsheets. The panorama spans colonial horrors to WW2 bombers and Japanese labour camps; dramas on river and sea and character portraits from Birdsville to Kings Cross. Morris’s voice is never less than totally engaged and engaging.”

Accolades
At the ARIA Music Awards of 2014, the album was nominated for ARIA Award for Best Blues and Roots Album, losing out to Flesh & Blood by John Butler Trio

Track listing

Personnel

Charts

Weekly charts

Year-end charts

Release history

References

2014 albums
Russell Morris albums